Ion Stăvilă (born 9 October 1958) is a Moldovan diplomat. He is the Moldovan Ambassador to Ukraine.

References

Living people
1958 births
20th-century Moldovan historians
Ambassadors of Moldova to Ukraine